The following elections occurred in the year 1904.

Europe
 1904 Portuguese legislative election

United Kingdom
 1904 Ashburton by-election
 1904 Normanton by-election
 1904 Rossendale by-election

North America

Canada
 1904 Canadian federal election
 1904 Edmonton municipal election
 1904 Newfoundland general election
 1904 Prince Edward Island general election
 1904 Quebec general election

United States
 1904 New York state election
 1904 South Carolina gubernatorial election
 1904 United States House of Representatives elections
 United States House of Representatives elections in California, 1904
 United States House of Representatives elections in South Carolina, 1904
 1904 United States presidential election
 1904 and 1905 United States Senate elections

South America 

 1904 Argentine presidential election
 1904 Guatemalan presidential election

Oceania

Australia
 1904 Melbourne by-election
 1904 Wilmot by-election

New Zealand
 1904 Pahiatua by-election

See also
 :Category:1904 elections

1904
Elections